Gorton Heritage Trail is located approximately 3 miles from the centre of Manchester, England. The trail has been designed to promote and conserve the heritage and wildlife of Gore Brook Valley. It lies mainly within the Gore Brook Conservation area. There are eight listed buildings and other places of interest along the trail.

The trail runs through what is still a surprisingly rural and environmentally diverse area; it has a meadow area along Gore Brook and a Butterfly Garden which give an ecological dimension to the trail.

Origins of the Trail 

Gorton Heritage Trail Action Group (GHTAG) was founded in 1997 by local residents who were inspired to protect, enhance and maintain the area, and bring attention to its sites.

Places of interest

Sunny Brow Park

Named after Sunny Brow Farm, which was originally on this site. It became a park in 1905

St. Philip's Church 
This Romanesque style parish church was opened in 1908 to serve the new houses being built in this area.

Peacock's Tree 
Planted by Richard Peacock, the founder of Gorton's famous locomotive works, in memory of his wife.

Gorton Hall Lodge 
Originally the entrance to the grounds of Gorton Hall, built in the 17th century and demolished in 1906. The lodge bears the initials of Richard Peacock who occupied the hall from 1865.

Maiden's Bridge 
The original bridge was built over Gore Brook in 1737 to save local women having to raise their skirts as they crossed the brook on stepping stones, as local legend has it.

Far Lane 
Once called Fir Lane or Further Lane, this was the original road into Manchester before Hyde Road was built in the 1820s. It still has its eighteenth-century cottages with numbers 46–50 dating from 1782.

Brookfield Lower Meadow

This is now a wildlife area through which the landscaped 'Peacock's Walk' was originally laid for its namesake to walk to church. The site of the Dissenters' chapel is in the area of the burial ground to the rear of Brookfield Church.

The Richard Peacock Mausoleum 
This ornate marble and stone tomb is the resting place of the industrialist, benefactor and Gorton's first MP who died in 1889.

Brookfield church and the 'dissenters graveyard'

Brookfield is a fine Grade II Listed Victorian Gothic Church, opened in 1871, built by Thomas Worthington, and commissioned by Richard Peacock of the powerful local Peacock and Beyer engineering and locomotive building firm. Known in its time as the "Unitarian Cathedral", it has a peel of eight bells in its tall steeple – all named for members of Peacock family.

Before its construction, in times of religious dissension and persecution, worshippers met secretly in an upstairs room of a house nearby at the junction of Abbey Hey Lane and Cross Lane.

Waggon and Horses 
The original pub on this site, dated to 1833, was later owned by John Jennison, the creator of Belle Vue Zoological Gardens. The present building dates from 1936.

Butterfly Garden

The trail crosses Hyde Road (A57) and enters an area planted specifically with butterflies in mind.

The Old Salt Road

Part of an ancient route going north from the salt mines of Northwich. The 'salt road' crosses the brook runs past the 'Vale Cottage' pub and then through foxfold, a wilder section of the trail!

Vale Cottage Inn 
Originally 18th-century cottages, it became a roadside inn when the Salt Road was in use.

Tanyard Brow

Site of an old tannery which closed in 1959 using the water of Gore Brook. Cottages 56–60* were built in the 18th century for tannery workers.  Finally the trail crosses Tanyard Brow and connects up to Gorton Lower Reservoir.

Spring Bank Farm 
Originally dating from 1780 and thatched, it has been much altered over the years.

Gorton Lower Reservoir 
Constructed in the 1820s to supply water to Manchester's rapidly expanding population. Amongst the first municipal reservoirs to be built in the country it is now used for recreation.

Debdale Park 
The land was originally purchased by Manchester City Council in the 1870s for further possible work around the reservoir. In time it became a recreation area and in 1929 a municipal park.

Gorton House 
Built by Robert Grimshaw in the 1790s. He was the first person to try and introduce mechanised weaving looms, but Luddites burned down his factory, and he went bankrupt. A hat-making factory and some workers’ cottages were built behind the house and over the next xx years a number of different families lived there. For some years it was used to house a girls’ boarding school, then one for boys, and then a successful engineering company. In 18   the Manchester City Council bought the house and surrounding land in case it was necessary to extend the reservoirs. It was rented to tenants, and later housed the Park Keeper and his Deputy, before being used as offices. The building has stood empty for many years and, although it has been listed by English Heritage, it is now in a dangerous condition.

Heritage Garden 
Opened in 2015 featuring plants that were used in local historical textile industries.

Gorton House Lodges 
These mark the entrance to the Grimshaw's estate; they have now been partly restored with one as a Visitor Centre.

References

4. www.brookfieldchurch.altervista.org

Tourist attractions in Manchester
Urban heritage trails